Voices or The Voices may refer to:

Film and television 
 Voices (1920 film), by Chester M. De Vonde, with Diana Allen
 Voices (1973 film), a British horror film 
 Voices (1979 film), a film by Robert Markowitz
 Voices (1995 film), a film about British composer Peter Warlock
 Voices (2007 film), a South Korean horror film
 The Voices, a 2014 horror comedy film 
 "Voices" (Ghost Whisperer), an episode of the TV drama

Literature    
 Voices (Indriðason novel), a 2006 translation of a 2003 crime novel by Arnaldur Indriðason
 Voices (Le Guin novel), a 2006 novel by Ursula K. Le Guin
 Voices (magazine), a monthly English literary magazine 1919–1921
The Voices, a 1969 book by Joseph Wechsberg
The Voices, a 2003 novel by Susan Elderkin
 Voices, the former journal of The Association for Feminist Anthropology

Music  
 Voices, former name of the a cappella group Voices in Your Head
 Voices (British band), a London black metal band
 Voices (American band), an early 1990s R&B girl group
 Voices (Henze), a musical composition by Hans Werner Henze

Albums  
 Voices (Claire Hamill album), 1986
 Voices (Gary Peacock album), 1971
 Voices (Hall & Oates album), 1980
 Voices (Judy Collins album), 1995
 Voices (Kenny Thomas album), 1991
 Voices (Matchbook Romance album), 2006
 Voices (Mike Stern album), 2001
 Voices (Murray Head album), 1981
 Voices (Phantogram album), 2014
 Voices (Roger Eno album), 1985 
 Voices (Stan Getz album), 1967
 Voices (U of Memphis album), 2007
 Voices (Vangelis album), 1995
 Voices (Wormrot album), 2016
 Voices: WWE The Music, Vol. 9, a 2009 compilation album
 Yanni Voices, a 2009 album by Yanni

Songs 
 "Voices" (Alice in Chains song), 2013
 "Voices" (Ann Lee song), 1999
 "Voices" (Cheap Trick song), 1979
 "Voices" (Chris Young song), 2008
 "Voices" (Disclosure song), 2013
 "Voices" (Disturbed song), 2000
 "Voices" (KSI song), 2023
 "Voices" (Motionless in White song), 2017
 "Voices" (Saosin song), 2006
 "Voices" (Tusse song), 2021
 "Voices", a song by Autopsy from Acts of the Unspeakable, 1992
 "Voices", a song by Crossfaith from The Artificial Theory for the Dramatic Beauty, 2009
 "Voices", a song by Crown the Empire from Limitless, 2011
 "Voices", a song by Dario G from Sunmachine, 1998
 "Voices", a song by Dave from Psychodrama (album), 2019
 "Voices", a song by Dream Theater from Awake, 1994
 "Voices", a song by Godsmack from The Other Side, 2004
 "Voices", a song by Madonna from Hard Candy, 2008
 "Voices", a song by Our Last Night from Age of Ignorance, 2012
 "Voices", a song by Roxette from Pearls of Passion, 1986
 "Voices", a song by Russ Ballard, 1984
 "Voices", a song by Sharpe & Numan from Automatic, 1989
 "Voices", a song by Stigmata from Hollow Dreams, 2003
 "Voices", a song by Switchfoot from Native Tongue, 2019
 "Voices", a song by Timothy B. Schmit from Playin' It Cool, 1984
 "Voices", a song by Zee from Identity, 1984
 "Voices", a song by MD.45 from The Craving, 1996

Other uses
Voices.com, a job search website for voice actors 
Voices groups in Australia, grassroots political organisations in Australia, whose names usually begin with "Voices of" or "Voices for"

See also 

 Voice (disambiguation)
 The Voice (disambiguation)
 Voicing (disambiguation)
 Auditory hallucination